Peter Addenbrooke Thomas (June 28, 1924 – April 30, 2016) was an American announcer and narrator of television programs with a career spanning more than 70 years, including shows such as Nova and Forensic Files.

Biography
Thomas was born in Pensacola, Florida, to British parents John D. Thomas, originally of Swansea, Wales, and Sibyl Addenbrooke, from Mumbles, Wales, daughter of Col. Addenbrooke of the RAF. He had two younger brothers, John and David. His father, a Church of England minister in Great Britain, then Presbyterian minister in the US, and his mother, who became a schoolteacher in the US, stressed the importance of reading, education, and memorization and visualization to their son. Thomas says that his father stressed mental images as an important speaking tool. For example, he told his son if he was talking about horses he had to picture horses in his mind.

Thomas began his career at 14 as an announcer on a local radio show. Since the station could not pay him due to his age, they arranged for the sponsor, Piper Aircraft, to give him flying lessons. Within a few years he was hosting Big Band remotes.

With the onset of World War II, Thomas left The Stony Brook School and volunteered for the United States Army in 1943, after being offered an Armed Forces Radio deferment, and served with the First Infantry Division in five major campaigns, including the Battle of Normandy and the Battle of the Bulge. He was issued a Battle star for each of the five campaigns. He was also awarded the Bronze Star, the Purple Heart, the Unit French Croix de Guerre, and Belgian Fourragère.

Thomas is still best known today for the series Forensic Files, which is broadcast in streams of episodes and has an enormous cult-following. He received scores of awards for his work but cited, as one of his best, the Oscar won by a documentary he narrated, One Survivor Remembers. The film, produced by HBO, chronicles the personal experience of Gerda Weissmann Klein, who was interned at the Nordhausen Concentration Camp when she was a teenager; Thomas' unit participated in the liberation of Nordhausen. Klein and Thomas met during the post-production of the documentary, and again at its premiere. Thomas also participated in an HBO film on the Battle of Hürtgen Forest, in which he fought with the 1st Infantry Division. Thomas was also the narrator for a miniseries that ran on The Discovery Channel in 1993 entitled How the West was Lost. Thomas was the narrator for the two-hour Nova episode entitled "D-Day's Sunken Secrets," broadcast May 28, 2014, just before the 70th anniversary of the D-Day landings; in his youth, he had participated in the original D-Day landing on Omaha Beach.

He worked at his home and, through ISDN, at recording studios throughout the United States. Also using ISDN, he continued narrating at recording studios in New York City, where he had worked for the bulk of his narration career. Before pursuing narration full-time, he was the New York anchor for CBS News. He continued to keep an apartment in midtown Manhattan for recordings that required his presence there. Thomas also recorded in many European capitals.

He has been called by many of his peers in his industry the greatest voice in the history of American broadcasting. He may be remembered most of all as the inimitable narrator of Forensic Files which continues to be broadcast to a worldwide audience and has a cult following of millions.

Personal life
Thomas married his high school sweetheart, Stella (née Barrineau) Thomas, on June 29, 1946; she died on June 16, 2014. The couple raised three children (Peter Jr., Douglas McMillan, and Elizabeth) in Greenwich, Connecticut, and in 1985, they settled in Naples, Florida. He was heavily involved in work with veterans, having served on the board of the National D-Day Memorial Foundation and in other similar roles. Having been involved in liberating Nordhausen, Thomas also was a strong supporter of the U.S. Holocaust Memorial Museum; he narrated the museum's original audio tour and documentary.

Thomas died on April 30, 2016, at the age of 91. He was memorialized at the end of the first episode of Forensic Files II which aired on February 23, 2020.

Other notable works
 Peter Thomas narrated a 33 rpm, 7-inch EP record, NASA Apollo 11 Mission, "Lunar Landing", 1969, Doubleday & Co., Record T-10483, issued 1969. 
 Thomas performed voice-overs for hundreds of television commercials, including Coca-Cola, IBM, Valvoline, NBC, United Technologies, Burger King, Beaumont Health and ESPN Monday Night Football commercials, as well as spots for social organizations including the YWCA and The Episcopal Church.
 Thomas narrated the NCAA's official highlight film of the 1985 NCAA Division I men's basketball tournament.  
 Thomas was heard in Paul Hardcastle's 1985 hit song "19," which Hardcastle composed after being inspired by a 1984 ABC documentary on the Vietnam War, titled Vietnam Requiem, which Thomas narrated. The song topped the charts in Hardcastle's native United Kingdom – also Thomas' parental homeland – and thirteen other countries. Thomas was paid royalties for the use of his voice in the song.
 Thomas provided the digitized voice for Philips' HeartStart series of automated external defibrillator (AED) units used by emergency services nationwide. Thomas' voice prompts and instructs emergency personnel on when to perform such tasks as starting and stopping CPR, when to press the button to deliver a shock and when the AED is analyzing the patient.
 Thomas was in high demand for political advertisements and did several films for the US Dept. of Veterans Affairs.
 Thomas narrated the Troll Associates series of audiobooks for children, including "Amazing World of Dinosaurs."
 Thomas narrated the CD version of Tuck Everlasting, a novel by Natalie Babbitt.
 Thomas narrated the Reader's Digest video series The Crucial Turning Points of World War II
 Thomas narrated the orientation video for the National World War I Museum at The Liberty Memorial in Kansas City, Missouri.
 Thomas narrated the TruTV true-crime documentary series Forensic Files, initially known as Medical Detectives.
 As of March 2013, Thomas could be heard voicing a national television spot for "Cool Whip."
 Thomas was the announcer of the underwriting credits on the Nature TV series on PBS from the early 1980s through 2015. He also was the announcer of the underwriting credits for the NOVA TV series on PBS from 1988 through 1996.

References

External links
 
 Peter Thomas Tribute – from truTV's Forensic Files.

1924 births
2016 deaths
People from Pensacola, Florida
United States Army personnel of World War II
United States Army soldiers
American male voice actors
The Stony Brook School alumni
American people of English descent
American people of Welsh descent